Román Alís (1931 – 2006) was a Spanish composer. He was born in Palma de Mallorca on August 24, 1931, and died in Madrid on 29 October 2006.

Education and training
Román Alís' interest in music emerged in Barcelona in 1947, encouraged by the cultural movement in that city, absent in other populations in which his life had developed earlier. While pursuing his musical studies at the Conservatorio Superior Municipal de Música in Barcelona, alongside instructors such as Luis Maria Millet, John Gibert Camins, John Pich Santasusana, Joachim Zamacois and Eduard Toldrá, popular music became very important in his early career. Performer, conductor, arranger, and composer worked for big bands, publishers, record labels, and radio. This certainly would not have been possible without his spontaneous ease of creation, which made him compose a large number of works from the start.

Career
After moving to Seville in 1960, he obtained the following year the First Place Grand Prize for Composition in the Divonne-Les-Bains International Contest held in Paris. There he was honoured by the organization, the jury, the press and the French Radiotelevisión, and was able to meet personally with musicians such as Olivier Messiaen, René Leibowitz, Jean Rivier and Louis Aubert. A few months later he retired to Divonne-les-Bains, a town very close to Geneva (Switzerland), and launched the Symphonie de Chambre, Op 27 (1962) for chamber orchestra. Later, in his time as a professor at Contrapunto y Fuga del Conservatorio in Seville, he was recognized as an important figure in the Sevillian musical life where he debuted a large number of works.

Biography
{| Valign=top
|-
| 1931 || Born on August 24, in Palma de Mallorca.
|-
| 1940 || Because of his father's job, moved to Vigo, where he started his baccalaureate with the Marist Sisters. He discovered the piano. 
|-
| 1944 || Moved in Residences in Zaragoza, where he continues his baccalaureate. He started to compose his first piano pieces.  
|-
| 1947 || Moved to Barcelona, finishing his baccalaureate.
|-
| 1948-59 || Román studied music at the Superior Municipal Conservatory of Music in Barcelona, with Rafael Gálvez, Luis María Millet, Juan Gibert Camins, Juan Pich Santasusana, Joaquín Zamacois, and Eduard Toldrá. He then graduated in Piano, Composition, and Orchestra Conducting. He started to come out as a pianist during those years. 
|-
| 1950 || Moved to the city of Mataró.
|-
| 1951 || Arranger, pianist and director of Big bands. Premiered his first compositions at the Maresma Radio.
|-
| 1952 || Made military service in Ceuta; founded and directed the Coral Transfer. 
Collaborated with the Conservatory of Ceuta.
|-
| 1954 || Resumed his musical studies and professional activities.
|-
| 1955 || He settled in Barcelona and continued his training, acting as accompanist in chamber groups and national radio stations in Barcelona and other Catalan cities.
|-
| 1956 || Was musical director of ballets at Francesc Moragas and Esbart Verdaguer and at the Chamber Orchestra of the Caixa. Premiered at the Palau de la Musica Catalana in Barcelona his first ballets. Worked with the Vocal Musical Youth Barcelona.
|-
| 1957 || Orchestra Manager at Protest Art Association in the National Palace of Montjuic. Offered several lectures in Barcelona and other Catalan towns. 
Debuted in Palma de Mallorca Print Op 6 (1952) for violin and piano.
|-
| 1958 || Acted and presented his work at the International Courses of Cultural Extension of the Principality of Andorra and the Ateneo of Barcelona.
|-
| 1960 || Moved to Seville. Collaborated as a compositor, arranger with the Fiesta publishers in Seville and Dakotam.
|-
| 1961 || Obtained the First Great International Composition Prize of Divonne-Les-Bains, held in Paris, and his work was interpreted at the Salle Gaveau in the French capital, where he met composers such as Olivier Messiaen, Bacarisse Salvador, Pierre Colombo, among others, who were members of the jury. 
Tribute and reception of the Embassy of Spain in Paris, Patrons and Jury held at Maxim's in Paris.

To be continued
|}

Catalog of works
{| class="wikitable" border="0" style="background:#ffffff" align="top" class="sortable wikitable"
|+ style="background-color: #e0e0e0; text-align:center;" | Catalogue of works by Román Alís
|-
! width="60 px"|Year
! width="60 px"|Opus
! Work
! width="200 px"|Type of Work
! width="60 px"|Length
|-
| 1947 || (f.c.)* || La danza de los muñecos for piano. || Solo Music (piano) ||
|-
| 1947 || (f.c.) || Pequeña pieza for piano. || Solo Music (piano) ||
|-
| 1948 || (f.c.) || Sonata for two pianos. || Solo Music (piano) ||
|-
| 1948 || (f.c.) || Sonatina for piano. || Solo Music (piano) ||
|-
| 1948 || (f.c.) || 2nd Sonatina for piano. || Solo Music (piano) ||
|-
| 1948 || (f.c.) || Waltz for piano. || Solo Music (piano) ||
|-
| 1948 || Opus 001 || Eu so nunca sospiro, Op. 1 for soprano and piano || Voice music (piano) ||
|-
| 1948 || (f.c.) || Barcarola for piano. || Solo Music (piano) ||
|-
| 1948 || (f.c.) || Prelude for piano. || Solo Music (piano) ||
|-
| 1948 || (f.c.) || 2nd Sonata for piano. || Solo Music (piano) ||
|-
| 1948 || Opus 002 || Suite for piano, Op. 2 || Solo Music (piano) ||
|-
| 1948 || (f.c.) || 2nd Waltz for piano. || Solo Music (piano) ||
|-
| 1950 || (f.c.) || 8 lessons for piano. || Solo Music (piano) ||
|-
| 1950 || Opus 004 || Pentacordos, Op. 4 for piano || Solo Music (piano) ||
|-
| 1950 || (f.c.) || Kyrie for voces u organ. || Voice music (organ) ||
|-
| 1950 || (f.c.) || Nocturno for piano. || Solo Music (piano) ||
|-
| 1950 || Opus 003 || Sola..., Op. 3 for soprano and piano || Voice music (piano)||
|-
| 1950 || (f.c.) || 3rd Sonata for piano. || Solo Music (piano) ||
|-
| 1950 || Opus 005 || Teño medo, Op. 5 for soprano and piano || Voice music (piano)||
|-
| 1951 || (f.c.) ||1st Fantasía for piano. || Solo Music (piano) ||
|-
| 1951 || (f.c.) || 2nd Fantasía for piano. || Solo Music (piano) ||
|-
| 1951 || (f.c.) || 3rd Fantasía for piano. || Solo Music (piano) ||
|-
| 1951 || (f.c.) || 3rd Waltz for piano. || Solo Music (piano) ||
|-
| 1952 || (f.c.) || 2 pieces for piano. || Solo Music (piano) ||
|-
| 1952 || Opus 005 || Impresión, Op. 6 for violin and piano || Chamber music (violin and piano) ||
|-
| 1952 || (f.c.) || Meditación for trumpet, celesta, harp and string. || Instrumental music ||
|-
| 1952 || (f.c.) || Meditación symphony for flute, oboe, clarinet, bassoon and strings. || Instrumental music ||
|-
| 1952 || (f.c.) || 2nd Nocturno for piano. || Solo Music (piano) ||
|-
| 1952 || (f.c.) || 3rd Nocturno for piano. || Solo Music (piano) ||
|-
| 1952 || (f.c.) || Sol de la mañana for soprano and piano. || Voice music (piano) ||
|-
| 1952 || (f.c.) || 4th Sonata for piano. || Solo Music (piano) ||
|-
| 1952 || (f.c.) || Sonata for violin and piano. || Chamber music (violin and piano) ||
|-
| 1952 || (f.c.) || 1st Toccata for violin and piano. || Chamber music (violin and piano) ||
|-
| 1952 || (f.c.) || 2nd Toccata for violin and piano. || Chamber music (violin and piano) ||
|-
| 1952 || (f.c.) || Trio for flute, violin and piano. || Chamber music ||
|-
| 1953 || (f.c.) || 5 corals «spiritualities» for choir. || Choir music ||
|-
| 1953 || Opus 006bis || Impresión no. 2, Op. 6 bis for flute and piano. || Chamber music (violin and piano) ||
|-
| 1953 || (f.c.) || La mare de deu d’agosto for choir. || Choir music ||
|-
| 1953 || (f.c.) || Voces del alma no I for violin and piano. || Chamber music (violin and piano) ||
|- 
| 1954 || Opus 007 || O toque da alba, Op. 7 for soprano and piano || Voice music (piano) ||
|-
| 1954 || (f.c.) || Pequeña pieza for clarinet and piano. || Chamber music ||
|-
| 1954 || (f.c.) || Symphonic poem for voices and orchestra. ||
|-
| 1953 || - || Poems for cobla || Cobla Music ||
|-
| 1954 || (f.c.) || Voces del alma no 2 for violin and piano. || Chamber music (violin and piano) ||
|-
| 1955 || Opus 009 || Agora, Op. 9 for soprano and piano || Voice music (piano) ||
|-
| 1955 || Opus 008 || Huacca-China, Op. 8 for soprano and musical ensemble [Ciudad durmiente - El sueño del caimán] || ||
|-
| 1955 || (f.c.) || Jardiner de la reina for contralto and piano. || Voice music (piano) ||
|-
| 1955 || (f.c.) || Trio for violin, cello and piano. || Chamber music ||
|-
| 1955 || (f.c.) || Un tiempo de quartet for string quartet. || Chamber music ||
|-
| 1955 || (f.c.) || Voces del alma no. 3 for violin and piano. || Chamber music (violin and piano) ||
|-
| 1956 || - || Ball de Garlandes for cobla || Cobla Music ||
|-
| 1956 || - || L’Esquerrana for cobla || Cobla Music ||
|-
| 1956 || Opus 011 || Meu pensamento, Op. 11 for soprano and piano || Música vocal (piano) ||
|-
| 1951 || Opus 010 || No eres, Op. 10 for voice and piano || Voice music (piano) ||
|-
| 1956 || (f.c.) || Voces del alma nº 4 for violin and piano. || Chamber music (violin and piano) ||
|-
| 1957 || Opus 013 || Adiós, Op. 13 for soprano and piano || Voice music (piano) ||
|-
| 1957 || - || Contrapás for cobla || Cobla Music ||
|-
| 1957 || - || Cuadro de mar for cobla || Cobla Music ||
|-
| 1957 || Opus 012 || Cuatro piezas breves, Op. 12 for piano || Solo Music (piano) || 
|-
| 1957 || - || Majorales for cobla || Cobla Music ||
|-
| 1957 || - || Pere Galleri for cobla || Cobla Music ||
|-
| 1957 || - || Pitulineta for cobla || Cobla Music || 
|-
| 1957 || - || Xatulineta for cobla || Cobla Music ||
|-
| 1958 || Opus 015 || Cada noite, Op. 15 for soprano and piano || Voice music (piano) ||
|-
| 1958 || Opus 014 || El mariner, Op. 14 for voice and piano || Voice music (piano) ||
|-
| 1958 || Opus 016 || Noemi, Op. 16 for mixed choir || Choir music ||
|-
| 1958 || Opus 018 || Poems from Baja Andalucía, Op. 18 for piano [Niños - Nubes - Fiesta - Siesta - Canción] || Solo Music (piano) ||
|-
| 1958 || Opus 017 || Poesía de estío, Op. 17 for mixed choir || Choir music ||
|-
| 1958 || Opus 020 || Al lado de mi cabaña, Op. 20 for voice and piano ||
|-
| 1959 || Opus 019 || Alleluia, Op. 19 for mixed choir || Choir music ||
|-
| 1959 || Opus 021 || Pater noster, Op. 21 for mixed choir || Choir music ||
|-
| 1960 || Opus 022 || string quartet, Op. 22 || Chamber music ||
|-
| 1960 || Opus 023 || Pastorcito que te vas, Op. 23 for voice and piano || Voice music (piano) ||
|-
| 1961 || Opus 024 || Music for ten instruments, Op. 24 || ||
|-
| 1961 || Opus 025 || Poems from la seguiriya gitana, Op. 25 for voice and piano [Paisaje - Sorpresa - Baladilla de los tres ríos] || Voice music (piano) ||
|-
| 1961 || Opus 026 || Sonatina, Op. 26 for piano || Solo Music (piano) ||
|-
| 1962 || Opus 027 || Symphonie de chambre, Op. 27 for chamber orchestra (E: VIII Divonne-les-Bains International Chamber music Festival, Teatro del Parque, Divonne-les-Bains (Francia) – 2.7.1962 – orchestra de Cámara de Genève, dir Pierre ColomboG: RSR. Encargo del Festival de Divonne-les-Bains. A Fleury Creton, Louis-Bernard Levy y Maurice Werner.) || Orchestral music || 20:00
|-
| 1962 || Opus 028 || Sonata for flute and piano, Op. 28 || Chamber music ||
|-
| 1962 || Opus 031 || Variaciones breves, Op. 31 for orchestra (E: Teatro Lope de Vega, Sevilla – 16.12.1962 – Agrupación de Cámara de Sevilla, dir Luis Izquierdo. A Luis Izquierdo. The work has 42 variations.) || Orchestral music ||
|-
| 1963 || Opus 038 || Hacia Belem, Op. 38 for the mixed choir to three voices (Ist version) || Choir music ||
|-
| 1963 || Opus 036 || Nocturnos de la luna gitana, Op. 36 for soprano and instrumental ensemble [Allegro del verde viento - Andante, quasi preludio del alba - Lento de la pena morena] ||
|-
| 1963 || Opus 034 || Preludio y cante, Op. 34 for flute || Solo Music (flute) ||
|-
| 1963 || Opus 032 || Sonata for guitar, Op. 32 || Solo Music (guitar) ||
|-
| || Opus 035 || Espejismos Sonoros, Op. 35, for guitar || Solo Music (guitar) ||
|-
| || Opus 037 || Salmo XXI de David, Op. 37 for choir and instrumental ensemble || Choir music (instruments) ||
|-
| 1963 || Opus 039 || Tres corales de estío, Op. 39 for mixed choir [Recuerdas - Aguas puras de tu amor - Cavaré...] || Choir music ||
|-
| 1964 || Opus 040 || Canciones de mirador, Op. 40 for voice and piano [Marina - Molinos de viento - Campo y cielo] ||
|-
| 1964 || Opus 044 || Coral, tema e imitación, Op. 44 for organ || Solo Music (organ) ||
|-
| 1964 || Opus 041 || Cuatro imágenes playeras, Op. 41 for piano [Amanecer de estío - Mar andaluza - Orilla marismeña - Nocturno de luna marinera] || Solo Music (piano) ||
|-
| 1964 || Opus 047 || Two movements for strings, Op. 47 for string orchestra [1. Lento dolcissimo – 2. Allegro vivo e con brio](E: Palau de la Música Catalana, Barcelona – 7.3.1965 – orchestra de Cámara de Barcelona, dir Antoni Ros Marbá.  Antoni Ros Marbá. I Premio Alemany i Vall de Juventudes Musicales de Barcelona.)|| Orchestral music || 14:00 
|-
| 1964 || Opus 048 || Fum, fum, fum, Op. 48 for mixed choir || Choir music ||
|-
| || Opus 049 || Four Pieces for Sax, Op. 49 || Solo Music ||
|-
| 1964 || Opus 046 || Sinfonietta, Op. 46 for orchestra (1. Allegro con allegreza – 2. Andante un poco lento quasi adagio – 3. Allegro con brio)(E: Teatro Lope de Vega, Sevilla – 8.9.1964 – orchestra Filarmónica de Sevilla, dir Luis IzquierdoG: RNE "A Albertina Domínguez, mi futura esposa".) || Orchestral music || 21:00
|-
| 1964 || Opus 045 || Sonata for piano, Op. 45 || Solo Music (piano) ||
|-
| 1964 || Opus 042 || Tema con variaciones, Op. 42 for piano || Solo Music (piano) ||
|-
| 1964 || Opus 043 || Trio for violin, cello and piano, Op. 43 || Chamber music ||
|-
| 1966 || Opus 056 || Estudio I for violin and piano, Op. 56 || Chamber music (violin and piano) ||
|-
| 1966 || Opus 058 || Estudio for trompa and piano, Op. 58 || Chamber music ||
|-
| 1966 || Opus 057 || Estudio for viola and piano, Op. 57 || Chamber music ||
|-
| 1966 || Opus 052 || Opus cámara, Op. 52 for piano || Solo Music (piano) ||
|-
| 1966 || Opus 054 || Sonata for clarinet and piano, Op. 54 || Chamber music ||
|-
| 1966 || Opus 050 || Suite for orchestra, Op. 50 [1. Fanfarria – 2. Allemande – 3. Courante – 4. Zarabanda – 5. Giga] (E: Teatro San Fernando, Sevilla – 6.3.1966 – orchestra Filarmónica de Sevilla, dir Román Alís) || Orchestral music || 17:00
|-
| 1967 || Opus 059 || Estudio II for violin and piano, Op. 59 || Chamber music (violin and piano) ||
|-
| 1967 || Opus 062 || Estudio for double bass and piano, Op. 62 || Chamber music ||
|-
| 1967 || Opus 061 || Estudio for cello and piano, Op. 61 || Chamber music ||
|-
| 1967 || Opus 064 || Misa simple, Op. 64 for mixed choir y organ [Kyrie - Agnus - Credo - Sanctus - Gloria] || ||
|-
| 1967 || Opus 060 || Music for un Festival en Sevilla, Op. 60 for orchestra [1. Sonatina del alba – 2. Cantares a la siesta del estío – 3. Nocturnos de fiestas] (E: XIII Festival de Sevilla, Festivales de España, Teatro Lope de Vega, Sevilla – 22.9.1967 – orchestra Filarmónica de Sevilla, dir Luis Izquierdo G: RNE) Premio de Arte de la Excelentísima Diputación de Sevilla (1967).) || Orchestral music || 15:00
|-
| 1967 || Opus 065 || Preludio, fantasía y tocata, Op. 65 for piano || Solo Music (piano) ||
|-
| 1968 || Opus 071 || Atmósferas, Op. 71 for clarinet and piano || Chamber music ||
|-
| 1968 || Opus 069 || Frase, Op. 69 for piano || Solo Music (piano) ||
|-
| 1968 || Opus 070 (f.c.) || Sintonía, Op. 70 for orchestra (El original se halla extraviado en los archivos de RTVE.) || Orchestral music ||
|-
| 1968 || Opus 066 || Tocata a la fuga de un ritmo gitano, Op. 66 for piano || Solo Music (piano) ||
|-
| 1968 || Opus 067 || Tres piezas for organ, Op. 67 || Solo Music (organ) ||
|-
| 1969 || Opus 072 || Los días de la semana, Op. 72 for piano [Lunes (la Luna) - Martes (Marte) - Miércoles (Mercurio) - Jueves (Júpiter) - Viernes (Venus) - Sábado (Saturno) - Domingo (el Sol) ] || Solo Music (piano) ||
|-
| 1969 || Opus 080 || Los salmos cósmicos, Op. 80. Superposiciones coral-symphonies about a song to the universe. (Lyrics by Román Alís based on an interpretation of the Psalms). 4 mixed choirs and orchestra. Commissioned by the Juan March Foundation. The original manuscript of the work is in the Library of Contemporary Music of the Juan March Foundation in Madrid.) || Orchestral music || 50:00
|-
| 1969 || Opus 077 || Eight popular Spanish songs, Op. 77 for piano [Ya se van los pastores (Leonesa) - Romance de ciego (Gallega) - Morito, pititón (Burgalesa) - Mi abuelo tenía un huerto (Asturiana) - La pastorcita (Catalana) - El marinero (Catalana) - El ermitaño (Leonesa) - Canción de Olivareros (Mallorquina)] || Solo Music (piano) ||
|-
| 1969 || Opus 073 || Suite for guitar, Op. 73 || Solo Music (guitar) ||
|-
| 1969 || Opus 079 || Variaciones melódicas for oboes, Op. 79 || Solo Music (oboe) ||
|-
| 1970 || Opus 083 || El cant de Lorelei, Op. 83 for soprano and piano [Deliri - Image - La nit morta] || Voice music (piano) ||
|-
| 1970 || Opus 085 || Reverberaciones, Op. 85 for orchestra (E: Teatro Real, Madrid – 18.10.1970 – orchestra Symphony de la Radiotelevisión Española (OSRTVE), dir Enrique García Asensio - G: RNE) «A Enrique García Asensio».) || Orchestral music || 13:00
|-
| 1970 || Opus 081 || Rima, Op. 81 for soprano and piano || Voice music (piano) ||
|-
| 1971 || Opus 091 || Discantus atonalis, Op. 91 for piano || Solo Music (piano) ||
|-
| 1971 || Opus 093 || Dodecafonías, Op. 93 for flute and piano || Chamber music ||
|-
| 1971 || Opus 090 || Fuente clara, Op. 90 for mixed choir || Choir music ||
|-
| 1971 || Opus 088 || La cuarta palabra de Cristo en la cruz, Op. 88 for piano || Solo Music (piano) ||
|-
| 1971 || Opus 087 || Series sobre anillos, Op. 87 for string quartet || Chamber music ||
|-
| 1972 || Opus 098 || Cuatro piezas for dos violas, Op. 98 [Fabordón - Gymel - Discantus - Organum] ||
|-
| 1972 || Opus 095 || Espoir, Op. 95 for mezzo-soprano and piano || Voice music (piano) ||
|-
| 1972 || Opus 097 || Quien tanto veros desea, Op. 97 for mixed choir || Choir music ||
|-
| 1973 || Opus 099 || Campus stellae, Op. 99 for musical ensemble || Instrumental music ||
|-
| 1973 || Opus 101 || El Sommi, Op. 101 for soprano and musical ensemble || Voice music (instrumental)
|-
| 1973 || Opus 100 || Epitafios cervantinos, Op. 100 for soprano, contralto, tenor, bass, choir and orchestra (Miguel de Cervantes) (1. Al caballero mal andante y a Sancho su escudero – 2. A Dulcinea rolliza y fea – 3. Al hidalgo loco y cuerdo.)(E: Semanas Cervantinas de Alcalá de Henares, Capilla de San Ildefonso de la Universidad, Alcalá de Henares, Madrid – 26.4.1973 – Elvira Padín, Vida Bastos, José Foronda, Jesús Zazo, Madrid Orchestra Symphony (OSM), dir Vicente Spiteri.G: RNE) Commissioned by the Commissioner General of music intended for Cervantes Weeks in Alcalá de Henares. "At Antonio Iglesias." There is a bound copy in the collection of the Cervantes Municipal Music Library in Madrid.) || Choir music || 39:00
|-
| 1974 || Opus 102 || La flor de la cañada, Op. 102 for mixed choir || Choir music ||
|-
| 1975 || Opus 104 || Dilataciones, Op. 104 for piano || Solo Music (piano) ||
|-
| 1975 || Opus 103 || El sueño de un poeta, Op. 103 for mixed choir || Choir music ||
|-
| 1975 || Opus 108 || Juguetes, Op. 108 for piano [La ratita saltarina - La muñeca andarina - El gatito dormilón - El osito blanco - El viejo mago - El caballo de cartón - El pequeño bebé] || Solo Music (piano) ||
|-
| 1976 || Opus 112 || Cántico for organ and orchestra, Op. 112 (E: Catedral, Sevilla – 6.12.1976 – José Ayarra, orchestra Filarmónica de Sevilla, dir Luis Izquierdo. Encargo de la Caja de Ahorros San Fernando de Sevilla.) || Orchestral music || 16:00
|-
| 1977 || Opus 116 || Balada de las cuatro cuerdas, Op. 116 for viola and piano || Chamber music ||
|-
| 1977 || Opus 115 || Rondó de danzas breves, Op. 115 for piano || Solo Music (piano) ||
|-
| 1977 || Opus 117 || Tres canciones amorosas for Contxa, Op. 117, for voz and piano [Otoño - Plenitud - Encuentro] || ||
|-
| 1978 || Opus 120 || Aleluyas a la Resurección de Cristo, Op. 120 for mixed choir y conjunto musical [Aleluya de la Tierra - Aleluya de los Cielos - Aleluya de los Hombres - Aleluya de los Muertos - Aleluya del Universo] || ||
|-
| 1978 || Opus 124 || Meeres Stille, Op. 124 for voice and piano || Voice music (piano) ||
|-
| 1978 || Opus 121 || Salauris, Op. 121 for orchestra (E: Festival de Chamber music, Cambrils, Tarragona – 6.7.1978 – orchestra del Festival de Cambrils, dir Román Alís.) Encargo del festival de Cambrils)|| Orchestral music || 14:00
|-
| 1978 || Opus 118 || Todos los niños cantan y bailan, Op. 118 Ballet infantil basado en temas populares de carácter infantil, for cuerpo de baile, coro de niños y orchestra infantil (melódica, 4 flutes de pico, 2 violines, carillón soprano y alto, xilófono soprano, alto y bajo, 2 percusionistas, piano, 2 guitars) {1. Introducción – 2. Antón pirulero – 3. Qué hermoso pelo tienes – 4. La viudita del Conde Laurel – 5. Tengo una muñeca – 6. Mambrú se fue a la guerra – 7. Que llueva – 8. El patio de mi casa – 9. Cucú cantaba la rana – 10. Quisiera ser tan alta...}(E: Centro Cultural de la Villa, Madrid – 18.2.1978 – Ballet infantil de Ana Lázaro, Agrupación Coral-instrumental de Juventudes Musicales de Alcalá de Henares, dir Ángel Manzanal, encargo de Ana Lázaro.) || Ballet || 120:00
|-
| 1979 || Opus 128 || Concert for recorder and strings, Op. 128 [I. Moderato tranquilo –2. Allegretto expresivo] (E: Festival Internacional de Música de Cambrils, Pinaret de Carles Roig, Cambrils, Tarragona – 21.7.1979 – Mariano Martín, orchestra del Festival (Strings section), dir Román Alís. - G: RNE) || || 11:00
|-
| 1979 || Opus 127 || María de Mágdala, Op. 127. Oratorio for soprano, recitador, corno inglés, mixed choir and orchestra de cuerda. (Texto de Román Alís) [1. Al alba del Yon Rischom – 2. La Noemi del valle – 3. La colina de la calavera] (E: XVIII Semana de la Música Religiosa de Cuenca, Iglesia de San Miguel, Cuenca – 12.4.1979 – María Orán, Antonio Medina, Jesús María Corral, Coro de la Agrupación Española de Cámara de Madrid, dir Odón Alonso (choir dir Pascual Ortega) - G: RNE) Encargo de la XVIII Semana de Música Religiosa de Cuenca.) || Oratorio || 36:00
|-
| 1980 || Opus 130 || Cántico de las soledades, Op. 130 for orchestra (E: Teatro Real, Madrid – 29.2.1980 – orchestra Nacional de España (ONE), dir Antoni Ros Marbá.) «A Laura Negro». Commissioned by National Orchestra of Spain (ONE).) || Orchestral music || 26:00
|-
| 1981 || Opus 132 || Tañimiento, Op. 132 for guitar || Solo Music (guitar) ||
|-
| 1981 || Opus 131 || Tres hojitas madre, Op. 131 for mixed choir || Choir music ||
|-
| 1982 || Opus 135 || Ámbitos, Op. 135 for loud saxophone || Solo Music (sax) ||
|-
| 1982 || Opus 136 || Arriba Galán, Op. 136 for mixed choir || Choir music ||
|-
| 1982 || Opus 133 || Tierra del alba, Op. 133 for mixed choir || Choir music ||
|-
| 1983 || Opus 138 || Canços de la Roda del Temps, Op. 138. (Salvador Espriu) Ciclo de canciones for soprano, harp and string orchestra. [I. Cançó d'albada – II. Cançó de la mort a l'alba – III. Cançó de la plenitud del mati – IV. Cançó del mati encalmat – V. Cançó de la mort resplendet – VI. Cançó de la vinguda de la tarda – VII. Cançó de pas de la tarda – VIII. Cançó del capvespre – IX. Cançó de la mort callada – X. Cançó del triomf de la nit – XI. Per a ser cantada en la meva nit – XII. Just abans de laudes] (Existe una reducción for voice and piano) (E: Iglesia de Santo Tomás, Avilés, Asturias – 11.4.1984 – Carmen Bustamante, orchestra Symphony de Asturias, dir Víctor Pablo Pérez - G: RNE (3, 8, 9 y 12) – LP) Encargo privado. Existe una reducción for soprano and piano realizada por el author) || Voice music || 21:00
|-
| 1983 || Opus 137 || Cantiga de aldeanus, Op. 137 for mixed choir || Choir music ||
|-
| 1983 || Opus 140 || Melody, Op. 140 for violin and piano || Chamber music (violin and piano) ||
|-
| 1983 || Opus 139 || Tú, Op. 139 for voice and piano (There is a version for cello and piano with the title Canción) ||
|-
| 1984 || Opus 142 || Septentrión, Op. 142 for instrumental ensemble [Alfa - Beta - Delta - Eta - Epsilon - Gamma - Zeta] || ||
|-
| 1984 || Opus 144 || Sonad campanitas, Op. 144 for soprano and piano || Voice music (piano) ||
|-
| 1985 || Opus 145 || Cantiga astur, Op. 145 for soprano, mixed choir and orchestra (Popular lyrics). (1. Allegro mosso e con brio – 2. Añada. Moderato tierno y expresivo, un poco rubato – 3. Vivo con brío y muy rítmico)E: Solemne Acto de Entrega de los Premios Príncipe de Asturias, Teatro Campoamor, Oviedo – 5.10.1985 – Josefina Arsegui, Coro de la Fundación Principado de Asturias, orchestra Symphony de Asturias, dir Víctor Pablo Pérez (dir coro Víctor Pablo Pérez) Encargo de la Fundación Príncipe de Asturias. Dedicada al Excelentísimo Señor Don Pedro Masaveu.) || ||35:00
|-
| 1985 || Opus 141 || Jesucristo en el desierto, Op. 141 oratorio for barítono mixed choir and orchestra (Texto de las Sagradas Escrituras). (E (1st word): VII Semana de Música de Avilés, iglesia de Santo Tomás, Avilés, Asturias – 11.4.1984 – Gregorio Poblador, Capilla Polifónica Ciudad de Oviedo, Asturias Symphony Orchestra, dir Víctor Pablo Pérez - E (integral): VII Semana de Música de Avilés, Catedral, Oviedo, Asturias – 27.3.1985 – Alfonso Echevarría, Oviedo University Choir, Asturias Symphony Orchestra, dir Víctor Pablo Pérez (choir dir Miguel A. Campos). Encargo de la Semana de Música de Áviles. || Oratorio || 47:00
|-
| 1985 || Opus 143 || Les chalumeaux gracieux, Op. 143 for dos clarinets [Divertimento - Canon - Fughetta - Motivo - Ostinato - Waltz- Final] || ||
|-
| 1985 || Opus 146 || Melody, Op. 146 for violin and piano || Chamber music (violin and piano) ||
|-
| 1986 || Opus 147 || Melody, Op. 147 for violin and piano || Chamber music (violin and piano) ||
|-
| 1986 || Opus 148 || Melody, Op. 148 for violin and piano || Chamber music (violin and piano) ||
|-
| 1987 || Opus 149 || Homenatge an Antoni Gaudí, Op. 149 for orchestra. Cantic simfonic (E: Palau de la Música Catalana, Barcelona – 4.4.1987 – Ciutat de Barcelona orchestra (OCB), dir Víctor Pablo PérezG: RNE) Encargo de la Orquestra Ciutat de Barcelona.) || Orchestral music || 19:00
|-
| 1987 || Opus 150|| Homage to Federico Mompou, Op. 150 for orchestra (E: Teatro Campoamor, Oviedo – 12.11.1987 – orchestra Symphony de Asturias, dir Víctor Pablo PérezG: RNE Commissioned by the Asturias Symphony Orchestra.) || Orchestral music || 25:00
|-
| 1988 || Opus 151 || Melody, Op. 151 for violin and piano || Chamber music (violin and piano) ||
|-
| 1989 || Opus 152 || Autol, Op. 152. 42'; Cuatro estampas symphonies for orchestra [1. Amanecer. El río Cidacos y el desfiladero – 2. La ermita de la Virgen de Nieva – 3. La leyenda del viejo castillo – 4. El picuezo y la picueza] (Estreno: Auditorio Municipal, Logroño – 9.6.1989 – orchestra Symphony de Euskadi, dir Manuel Galduf. Encargo de la Asociación Promúsica Fermín Gurbindo. «A la memoria de Fermín Gurbindo».) || Orchestral music|| 42:00
|-
| 1989 || Opus 155 || Concierto for piano y orchestra de cuerda, Op. 155 [I. Adaggietto affecttuoso – 2. Allegrissimo spiritoso – 3. Allegro moderato e con brío] (E: Teatro Principal, Alicante – 29.11.1991 – José Ortiga, orchestra de la Comunidad de Madrid, dir Miguel Groba. Encargo de la ONCE. «A José Ortiga».)|| Orchestral music|| 34:00
|-
| 1989 || Opus 153 || Fantasía for guitar, Op. 153 || Solo Music (guitar) ||
|-
| 1989 || Opus 038 || Hacia Belem, Op. 38 for mixed choir a cuatro voces (2ª versión) || Choir music ||
|-
| 1989 || Opus 154 || Himno de la Liga Naval Española, Op. 154 for male choir and band ||
|-
| 1989 || Opus 156 || Sonata for two violins, Op. 156 || Chamber music ||
|-
| 1990 || Opus 158 || Discantus Sobre el Salmo XLVI de David, Op. 158 for female choir || Choir music ||
|-
| 1990 || Opus 160 || Melody, Op. 160 for violin and piano || Chamber music (violin and piano) ||
|-
| 1991 || Opus 161 || Aria y danza, Op. 161 for orchestra [1. Aria – 2. Danza] (E: Auditorio Nacional, Madrid – 11.4.1991 – orchestra Nacional de España (ONE), dir Luis Aguirre.) «A Laura Negro» || Orchestral music || 12:00
|-
| 1991 || Opus 163 || Estampas del Madrid goyesco, Op. 163 (Andrés Ruiz Tarazona) for mixed choir and orchestra [I. Pórtico. Ronda de Seguidillas. Baile de majas en el Manzanares – II. Camino del Pardo. El Majo de la guitar – III. Trocha de la insurrección. The May 3 shoutings in the Príncipe Pío mountains] (Preestreno): Ermita de San Marcos, San martín de la Vega, Madrid, Madrid Community Choir, dir Miguel Groba - E: Auditorio Nacional de Música, Madrid – 2.5.1991 – Madrid Community Choir, dir Miguel Groba - G: CD – MC). Commissioned by the Madrid Community.) || Choir music || 30:00 
|-
| 1991 || Opus 165 || Evocando al poeta... Rubén Darío, Op. 165. Cuatro canciones for soprano y orchestra. (Texto de Rubén Darío) [I. Dice mía. – II. ¡Aleluya!. – III. Vésper – IV. Pájaros de las islas] (Existe una versión for soprano and piano) (E: Auditorium, Palma de Mallorca – 30.1.199 – Enriqueta Tarrés, Baleares Symphony Orchestra, dir Anthony Moors Commissioned by the Baleares Symphony Orchestra.) || Voice music (orchestral) || 30:00
|-
| 1991 || Opus 166 || Melody, Op. 166 for violin and piano || Chamber music (violin and piano) ||
|-
| 1991 || Opus 164 || Variaciones ornamentales, Op. 164 for violin ||
|-
| 1992 || Opus 167 || Sonata for loud sax and piano, Op. 167 ||
|-
| 1993 || Opus 171 || Canción de la vanidad, Op. 171 for mixed choir || Choir music ||
|-
| 1993 || Opus 170 || Para Ángela, Op. 170 for piano || ||
|-
| 1993 || Opus 168 || Passaglia for trumpet and organ, Op. 168 ||
|-
| 1994 || Opus 172 || Tres bagatelas, Op. 172 for loud saxophone and piano ||
|-
| 1995 || Opus 173 || Canciones visnavas, Op. 173 for soprano, flute and piano [Esta mañana - Saki] || Voice music (instrumental) ||
|-
| 1995 || Opus 175 || Sis remembranças  Eduard Toldrá, Op. 175, for violin and string orchestra [I. Sol ixent (vilanova i la Geltrú) – 2. La renaixença (Barcelona) 3. La noia que semblava una melody de Schumann (Castelló d'Empuries) – 4. La casona d'estiu (Cantallops) – 5. La Ciseta – 6. Sol ponent] (E: Concierto Homenaje an Eduard Toldrá, Sala Cultural de Caja Madrid, Barcelona – 26.10.1995 – Manuel Villuendas, orchestra de Cámara Eduard Toldrá, dir Manuel Villuendas - G: RNE) || || 34:00
|-
| 1996 || Opus 176 || Adagietto, Op. 176 for string quartet ||
|-
| 1996 || || Canción for cello and piano || Chamber music ||
|-
| 1996 || Opus 180 || Resonancias de la Antequeruela alta, Op. 180 for clave ||
|-
| 1996 || Opus 133 || Tierra del alba, Op. 133 for string quartet || Chamber music ||
|-
| 1997 || Opus 184 || Accordaos, Op. 184 for soprano and piano || Voice music (piano) ||
|-
| 1997 || Opus 186 || Céfiros al alba de Sunion, Op. 186 for large mixed choir || Choir music ||
|-
| 1997 || Opus 182 || Introducció a mort de dama, Op. 182 [El barri antic - Els gats - A l’altre cap de la ciutat] ||
|-
| 1997 || Opus 187 || La noche santa, Op. 187 for mixed choir || Choir music ||
|-
| 1997 || Opus 181 || Saxoxas, Op. 181 for loud saxophone and piano || || 
|-
| 1997 || Opus 185 || Tres morfologías, Op. 185 for violin and cello || ||
|- 
| 1997 || Opus 183 || Trio for flute, clarinet and piano, Op. 183 || Chamber music ||
|-
| 1998 || Opus 188 || Reverie, Op. 188. Ensueño sinfónico for orchestra (E: XIV Festival Internacional de Música Contemporánea de Alicante, Teatro Principal, Alicante – 24.9.1998 – orchestra Nacional de Oporto, dir Manuel Ivo CruzG: RNE Encargo del Centro for la Difusión de la Música Contemporánea (CDMC) del Ministerio de Cultura for el Festival Internacional de Música Contemporánea de Alicante, 1998. «A Laura Negro») || Orchestral music || 13:00
|-
| 1999 || Opus 190 || Divertimento, Op. 190 for saxophone quartet || Chamber music ||
|-
| || - || orchestración de Eduardo Toldrá: Music for six Sonnets for violin and string orchestra || Orchestral music||
|-
| || - || Music for the movie La Espuela. || Cinema music ||
|-
| || - || Music for the movie La petición. || Cinema music ||
|-
| || - || Music for the movie Melodrama Infernal. || Cinema music ||
|-
| || - || Music for the movie Vera, un Cuento Cruel. || Cinema music ||
|-
| || - || Music for Ciclo Grifith (television). || Music for television ||
|-
| || - || Music for Cine Mudo (television). || Music for television ||
|-
| || - || Music for El Camino (television). || Music for television ||
|-
| || - || Music for El Hada Rebeca (television). || Music for television ||
|-
| || - || Music for Especial Charlie Rivel (television). || Music for television ||
|-
| || - || Music for La Mocedad del Mío Cid (television). || Music for television ||
|-
| || - || Music for La Mujer y el Deporte (television). || Music for television ||
|-
| || - || Music for La Promesa (television). || Music for television ||
|-
| || - || Music for La Prudente Venganza (television). || Music for television ||
|-
| || - || Music for La Rama Seca (television). || Music for television ||
|-
| || - || Music for Rosaura a las 10 (television). || Music for television ||
|-
| || - || Music for Sombras Recobradas (television). || Music for television ||
|-
| || - || Music for the theatrical work El Cómic Cómico Ruidoso de Don Roberto. || Theater music ||
|-
| || - || Music for the theatrical work Motín de Brujas. || Theater music ||
|-
| || - || Music for the theatrical work Ondina. || Theater music ||
|-
| || - || Music for El Mosaico. (radio) ||
|}
(*) (f.c.) means outside or withdrawn from Catalogue.

References

1931 births
2006 deaths
Spanish composers
Spanish male composers
20th-century Spanish musicians
20th-century Spanish male musicians